Jõesuu is a village in Jõelähtme Parish, Harju County in northern Estonia. It's located on the around the mouth of the Jägala River to the Ihasalu Bay (part of the Gulf of Finland), north of the Jägala Waterfall.

Gallery

References

 

Villages in Harju County